Elections were held in Frontenac County, Ontario on October 24, 2022 in conjunction with municipal elections across the province.

Frontenac County Council
Frontenac County Council consists of the mayors of each of the four constituent municipalities plus an additional councillor from each municipality.

Central Frontenac
Frances L. Smith was re-elected by acclamation.

Frontenac Islands
The following were the results for mayor of Frontenac Islands.

North Frontenac
The following were the results for mayor of North Frontenac.

South Frontenac
The following were the results for mayor of South Frontenac.

References

Frontenac
Frontenac County